Rezaul Bari Dina (29 July 1951 – 18 June 2014) is a Bangladesh Nationalist Party politician and the former Member of Parliament of Bogra-2.

Career
Dina was elected to parliament from Bogra-2 as a Bangladesh Nationalist Party candidate in 2001. He served as the whip.

Death
Dina died on 18 June 2014 in City Hospital, Dhanmondi, Dhaka, Bangladesh.

References

1951 births
2014 deaths
Bangladesh Nationalist Party politicians
6th Jatiya Sangsad members
8th Jatiya Sangsad members
People from Bogra District